Yana Birde (Yañıbirźe) is a rural locality (selo) in Chekmagushevsky District, Bashkortostan, Russia. The population was 324 as of 2010. There are 2 streets.

Geography 
Yana Birde is located 27 km southwest of Chekmagush (the district's administrative centre) by road. Starosurmetovo is the nearest rural locality.

References 

Rural localities in Chekmagushevsky District